The Tucson Weekly is an alternative newsweekly that was founded in 1984 by Douglas Biggers and Mark Goehring, and serves the Tucson, Arizona, metropolitan area of about 1,000,000 residents. 

The paper is a member of the Association of Alternative Newsmedia. New issues arrive at kiosks throughout Tucson every Wednesday. Jim Nintzel is the current editor. Staff members include Logan Burtch-Buus, Tirion Morris, Christopher Boan, Jeff Gardner, Kathleen Kunz and Chelo Grubb.

The founding editor was Douglas Biggers, who served as editor and publisher until he sold the paper to Wick Communications in 2000. He founded Edible Baja Arizona. 

Longtime editor Jimmy Boegle left the Weekly in late 2012 to start his own independent paper in Palm Springs, California.

10/13 Communications bought the paper from Wick in 2014. 

In 2021, Times Media Group acquired the Tucson publications of 10/13 Communications (including The Explorer, the Marana News, Foothills News, Desert Times, Tucson Weekly, and Inside Tucson Business).

Notable journalists
Former editors include Dan Huff, Carol Ann Bassett, James Reel, Michael Parnell, Dan Gibson and Mari Herreras. Longtime Weekly and Arizona Daily Star reporter Chris Limberis was posthumously inducted into the Arizona Newspaper Association Hall of Fame in 2006.

Red Meat
The Tucson Weekly was a launching point for the comic strip Red Meat, created by Tucsonan Max Cannon in 1989.

See also
 List of alternative weekly newspapers

References

External links
 Tucson Weekly official site

Alternative weekly newspapers published in the United States
Newspapers published in Arizona
Mass media in Tucson, Arizona
Publications established in 1984
Wick Communications publications
1984 establishments in Arizona